The 1972 All-Ireland Senior Camogie Championship Final was the 41st All-Ireland Final and the deciding match of the 1972 All-Ireland Senior Camogie Championship, an inter-county camogie tournament for the top teams in Ireland.

The marking was tight on both sides and this impeded the quality of play; Cork won by four points, mostly due to their superior defence.

References

All-Ireland Senior Camogie Championship Final
All-Ireland Senior Camogie Championship Final
All-Ireland Senior Camogie Championship Final, 1972
All-Ireland Senior Camogie Championship Finals
Cork county camogie team matches
Kilkenny county camogie team matches